Tore Bøgh (2 April 1924 – 2 August 2017) was a Norwegian civil servant and diplomat.

Life
He was born in Kristiansand and was hired in the Ministry of Foreign Affairs in 1950. He became deputy under-secretary of state there in 1976 before serving as Norway's ambassador to Yugoslavia from 1980 to 1988 and to Portugal from 1988 to 1992.

References

1924 births
2017 deaths
People from Kristiansand
Norwegian civil servants
Ambassadors of Norway to Yugoslavia
Ambassadors of Norway to Portugal